Ardón is a municipality located in the province of León, Castile and León, Spain. According to the 2004 census (INE), the municipality has a population of 659 inhabitants.

See also
Leonese language
Kingdom of León
Nodicia de Kesos

References

Municipalities in the Province of León